In military terms, 121st Division or 121st Infantry Division may refer to:

 121st Infantry Division (German Empire)
 121st Infantry Division (Germany)
 121st Division (Imperial Japanese Army)
121st Rifle Division (Soviet Union)
121st Guards Rifle Division (Soviet Union)

sl:Seznam divizij po zaporednih številkah (100. - 149.)#121. divizija